Gunn: Spotlight is a comic based on the Angel television series. This title, along with the others in IDW Publishing's Spotlight series, was collected in the Angel: Spotlight trade paperback.

Story description

Summary
Gunn's naive cousin ends up in L.A. having run away from his home in Ohio. Gunn must try to find him before the city chews him up and spits him out. This is the first comic to feature Gunn as a main character.

Expanded overview

Angel, Spike, Wesley, and Gunn return to the Wolfram & Hart offices after defeating a demon. Wesley's vision has been damaged as a result of the fight, but he calls the mission "an unqualified triumph" nonetheless. Later, Gunn confides in Angel that he is getting sick of the pressures and responsibilities of his job; as he says, "this is not what my mama raised me for." Angel encourages Gunn to get some rest.

As Gunn enters his office, Harmony puts through a call from his cousin, Latonya. She tells him that another cousin, fifteen-year-old Mario, has run away from his home in Dearborn, Michigan, to Los Angeles. As Gunn sets out to find Mario, Angel warns him that he won't have backup, as the gang is all off to Macedonia to meet someone who may be able to fix Wesley's vision.

That night, Gunn arrives at a seedy-looking bar called "Bloody Crab." The bouncers deny him entry because he looks like a lawyer - out of place in this neighbourhood. Gunn replies that he was raised in this neighbourhood, beats the bouncers, and enters the bar. Inside, his cousin Mario has already joined a gang. Gunn takes Mario aside to talk; Mario points out that he is in exactly the same position Gunn himself was in years ago, and that he's doing fine. Gunn replies that Marios new "crew" isn't even human. At this point "Carlton," the gang's leader, intervenes. He tells Gunn to leave Mario behind, "before anything drastic happens." Gunn taunts Carlton, and is attacked by one of the gang members. Out of respect to their new member Mario, Carlton promises to merely damage, and not destroy, Gunn. They throw a badly beaten Gunn into an alley.

Later, at the W&H offices, Gunn is using his corporate resources to track down Carlton. He signs out a battle axe from the firm and sets out. He interrogates a demon named Otis into telling him about a "fight club" run out of an auto body shop that Carlton frequents. Otis claims that Carlton is planning on stealing the night's jackpot from the club.

At the fight club, Carlton is denied the opportunity to place any bets until he has faced a large demon - the club champion - in combat. As Carlton protests, the champ attacks and a battle ensues. Gunn arrives and pulls Mario out of harm's way. While everyone is distracted by the champion's fatal defeat of Carlton (by eating his face), Gunn and Mario make their escape, taking the briefcase of prize money with them.

In Gunn's convertible, Mario is coming to the realization that Gunn wasn't lying when he said the gang members weren't human, and that Los Angeles really can chew you up and spit you out. Suddenly, the champion lands on the car, demanding the prize money. Gunn tells Mario to take the wheel, and attacks with his axe. However, Gunn is knocked from the vehicle, and the champion turns his attention to Mario. Gunn had managed to catch the rear of the car with the axe, and climbs back into the vehicle. Taking the champion by surprise, Gunn decapitates the demon.

After putting Mario on a bus back to Michigan, Gunn returns to his office. Wesley, vision restored, stops by to ask how Gunn's mission went. A happy Gunn replies, "I didn't want to deal with it at first. All these people relying on me all the time, gets kind of...big. But y'know, once you get used to it...it feels pretty good."

Writing and artwork
Harmony tells Gunn, "my last snack had, like, seven espressos," implying she had fed on a human. In "Harm's Way" it is stated that Wolfram & Hart employees are forbidden to do this.
In this issue, Harmony is stationed at a small desk directly outside Gunn's office – a workstation never seen in the TV series.

Cultural references
Walt Disney World: Wesley says his vision reminds him of "the nightly fireworks display at that amusement park in Florida," a likely reference to The Magic Kingdom at the Walt Disney World Resort.
American Beauty: Gunn compares his situation at Wolfram and Hart to that of Kevin Spacey in American Beauty.
Mr. Pibb: Wesley says the potion used to restore his eyesight tasted like "flat, warm Mr. Pibb."

Continuity

Canonical issues

Angel comics such as this one are not usually considered by fans as canonical. Some fans consider them stories from the imaginations of authors and artists, while other fans consider them as taking place in an alternative fictional reality. However unlike fan fiction, overviews summarising their story, written early in the writing process, were 'approved' by both Fox and Joss Whedon (or his office), and the books were therefore later published as officially Buffy merchandise.

References

Angel (1999 TV series) comics